"Cúrame" (English: "Cure Me") is a song by American singer Prince Royce and Colombian singer Manuel Turizo. The single was released on all music streaming platforms on June 7, 2019 as the third single for Royce's sixth studio album Alter Ego (2020). The music video was released the day before.

Charts

Weekly charts

Certifications

References

2019 songs
2019 singles
Male vocal duets
Manuel Turizo songs
Prince Royce songs
Songs written by Prince Royce
Sony Music Latin singles
Spanish-language songs